Not Now, Darling is a 1973 British comedy film adapted from the 1967 play of the same title by John Chapman and Ray Cooney. The plot is a farce centred on a shop in central London that sells  fur coats. A loosely related sequel Not Now, Comrade was released in 1976.

It was the last film to feature appearances by Cicely Courtneidge and Jack Hulbert who had been a leading celebrity couple in the 1930s and 1940s.

Plot
Gilbert Bodley (Leslie Phillips) plans to sell an expensive mink to mobster Harry McMichaell (Derren Nesbitt), cheaply, for his wife Janie (Julie Ege). Janie is Gilbert's mistress, and Gilbert wants to "close the deal." However, instead of doing his own dirty work, he gets his reluctant partner Arnold Crouch (Ray Cooney) to do it for him. Things go awry when Harry plans to buy the same coat for his own mistress, Sue Lawson (Barbara Windsor), and the whole plan fails.

Cast
 Trudi Van Doorn as Miss Whittington
 Leslie Phillips as Gilbert Bodley
 Julie Ege as Janie McMichael
 Joan Sims as Miss Ambrosine Tipdale
 Derren Nesbitt as Harry McMichael
 Ray Cooney as Arnold Crouch
 Bill Fraser as Commissionaire
 Jack Hulbert as Commander George Frencham
 Cicely Courtneidge as Mrs Harriet Frencham
 Barbara Windsor as Sue Lawson
 Moira Lister as Maude Bodley
 Jackie Pallo as Mr Lawson
 Peter Butterworth and Graham Stark (both uncredited) as Painters

References

External links
 
 
 
 

1973 films
1973 comedy films
British comedy films
Films shot at EMI-Elstree Studios
British films based on plays
Films based on works by Ray Cooney
Films set in England
Films set in London
Dimension Pictures films
1970s English-language films
1970s British films